Urshady (Ürşiźe) is a rural locality (a village) in Urmiyazovsky Selsoviet, Askinsky District, Bashkortostan, Russia. The population was 276 as of 2010. There are 7 streets.

Geography 
Urshady is located 41 km east of Askino (the district's administrative centre) by road. Russky Sars is the nearest rural locality.

References 

Rural localities in Askinsky District